Zephaniah Legumana, was the fourth Anglican Bishop of Ysabel, one of the nine dioceses that make up the Anglican Church of Melanesia. He served from 28 January 2000 to 2003.

References

Living people
21st-century Anglican bishops in Oceania
Anglican bishops of Ysabel
Year of birth missing (living people)
Place of birth missing (living people)